Dog Land, Dogland or Doglands can refer to: 

Dog Land (app), a dog-themed iOS application
Dog Land (attraction), a defunct tourist attraction in Chiefland, Florida
Dogland, a 1997 novel by Will Shetterly
Doglands, a 2011 novel by Tim Willocks

See also
Doggerland